The Ford NAA tractor (also known as the Ford NAA) is a tractor that was introduced by Ford as an entirely new model in 1953 and dubbed the Golden Jubilee.  
The NAA designation was a reference to the first three digits of the serial number style used starting with this tractor.  It was designed as a replacement for the Ford N-Series tractors.   Larger than the 8N, the Golden Jubilee featured live hydraulics, a 50th-year Golden Jubilee badging, an overhead-valve "Red Tiger" four-cylinder engine and streamlined styling, but just as significantly, it was the first tractor Ford built after losing its court battle with Harry Ferguson in 1952 over the patents the Irish inventor held on the Ferguson System three-point hitch.

Engine
Below the NAA's new hood was a 134-cu.in., overhead-valve, gas-burning inline four-cylinder engine worth 32 hp. Ford's British Fordson tractors were readily available with diesel engines, but in the States, diesels were still uncommon. A kerosene-burning NAA, known as the NAB, was an option but found few buyers.

Transmission
A four-speed transmission was standard on the NAA, and auxiliary gearing was available.

Hydraulics
The NAA's Solid System hydraulics relied on an engine-driven hydraulic pump rather than the PTO-driven pump that was standard issue on the N tractors (this meant that the hydraulics could be operated without the PTO being engaged) and a live PTO was optional.

Other changes
The NAA is also slightly larger than its predecessors: four inches longer, four inches higher and 100 pounds heavier at 2,840 pounds.
For 1954, The NAA was carried over, sans the Golden Jubilee badging (which is popular with collectors today), with only a gear ratio change. In late 1954, Ford introduced its three-digit number series tractors, which further improved upon the NAA. The 600 incorporated improved brakes and wheel seals as well as an ASAE standard PTO. The 700 was a row-crop tractor that could be ordered with either a tricycle or wide front end.

References

External links

Tractor Data for NAA

Ford tractors
Tractors